Polypoetes rubribasis is a moth of the family Notodontidae. It is found along the eastern slope of the Andes from central Peru south to Argentina, at elevations between 1,500 and 2,500 meters.

References

Moths described in 1925
Notodontidae of South America